Not war nor peace (Macedonia Cyrillic: Ниту војна ниту мир) is a book about Albanian terrorism in Macedonia in 2001.

See also
List of books about Albanian terrorism in 2001 in Macedonia
Insurgency in the Republic of Macedonia

References

Macedonian literature
Macedonian-language books
2001 insurgency in Macedonia